Ōkami is an action-adventure video game.

Okami or variants may also refer to:

People
 Kei Okami (1859–1941), a Japanese physician
 Yushin Okami (born 1981), a Japanese mixed martial artist

Other uses
 Japanese wolf, historically ōkami, an extinct subspecies of the gray wolf
 Kuraokami, or Okami, a legendary Japanese dragon and Shinto deity of rain and snow
 Okami Station, a station in Shimane Prefecture, Japan

See also

 Okami-san, a sports manga 
 Okami-san and Her Seven Companions, a collection of Japanese light novels